Travis Jayner (born May 9, 1982 in Riverview, New Brunswick) is a Canadian-born American short track speed skater who is a member of the US Olympic Team for the 2010 Winter Olympics in Vancouver, British Columbia. He earned a bronze medal in the 5000-meter relay with teammates Apolo Ohno, J.R. Celski, Jordan Malone and Simon Cho.

He is currently the Short Track Speedskating Elite Athlete Representative for the US Speedskating Board of Directors.

Early life
Jayner's father, Jack Jayner, was a U.S. and North American short track champion in high school, and Canadian short track champion 11 years later, early in his business career as an architect. In 1975 he founded a speed skating club in Moncton, New Brunswick, Canada, and introduced Travis and his brother Alex to the sport when they were five years old.

Born to unilingual English-speaking parents, Jayner successfully completed the Early Total French Immersion Option of Frank L. Bowser Elementary School in Riverview, New Brunswick – in which only French is spoken in Grades 1,2, and 3. He cultivated this grounding with speed skaters from Quebec whom he met regularly at youth-age competitions, training camps, and sport summer schools, both in Quebec and New Brunswick cities, achieving fluency in French by the end of high school.

He avidly participated in many sports including volleyball, soccer, cross country running, high-jumping and ball hockey (as goaltender) – earning high school letters while maintaining academic honors.

Jayner graduated in 2000 from Riverview High School. Accepted by both McGill and Concordia Universities, he promptly moved to Montreal and took an apartment off-campus (with Quebec skater Olivier Jean) to be near the National Training Center in the Maurice Richard Arena. They were coached by Dany Lemay and Yves Hamelin. Off-season they inline road-raced often – including the 24-hour team event on the city's Formula One high performance auto track.

During these years Jayner's academics focused on engineering and urban studies while, as a skater, he moved up the ranks, participating in several CanAm competitions. As a result of contacts established at these cross-border invitational meets, Jayner played host to Ryan Bedford (of Michigan) and Jordan Malone (of Texas) in Montreal – showing them around town, introducing them to the local short track skating scene and advising them on dealing with the French language – during times when they sought diverse independence in their training programs and experience.

At the 2003 Canada Winter Games in Bathurst/Campbellton, Jayner represented his home province of New Brunswick, winning a silver medal in the men's short track 3000m.

In 2004 a convergence of interests, circumstances and opportunities resulted in Jayner's move to Midland, Michigan – where Ryan Bedford and his family returned hosting favors. Jayner subsequently skated and dryland-trained in the summer in Marquette, Michigan, with Shani Davis – who was active in both short track and long track pursuits at that time. That fall, Jayner accepted an invitation to train at the USA National Center in Colorado Springs, Colorado – in a program directed by Derek Campbell.

Professional career
In September 2005, Jayner qualified for his first World Cup Team – a tour of 4 competitions – the final two being Olympic Qualifier events – determining the Nation Quotas for the 2006 Olympic Games in Torino, Italy. The USA qualified a maximum Olympic squad.

See also
 List of people from Riverview, New Brunswick

References

External links
 ISU profile
 
 Travis Jayner's video blogs on Vimeo

1982 births
American male short track speed skaters
Living people
Short track speed skaters at the 2010 Winter Olympics
Olympic bronze medalists for the United States in short track speed skating
Medalists at the 2010 Winter Olympics
People from Riverview, New Brunswick